This is a discography of The Black Crowes, an American hard rock/jam band formed in 1984 by Chris and Rich Robinson. Their first studio album, Shake Your Money Maker, was released in 1990. Helped by the singles "Twice As Hard", "Jealous Again", "Hard to Handle", "She Talks to Angels", and "Seeing Things", the album peaked at number four on the Billboard 200 and went five times platinum in the United States. "Hard to Handle" and "She Talks to Angels" both reached number one on the Hot Mainstream Rock Tracks chart.

In 1992, The Black Crowes released the studio album The Southern Harmony and Musical Companion, which reached number one on the Billboard 200 and went two times platinum in the US. It was the band's last album to go platinum. Four singles from the album ("Thorn in My Pride", "Sting Me", "Remedy", and "Hotel Illness") topped the Hot Mainstream Rock Tracks chart, bringing the band's overall total to six.

The Black Crowes released three more studio albums that decade: Amorica in 1994, Three Snakes and One Charm in 1996, and By Your Side in 1999. Amorica was certified gold in the US. In 2000, they released the compilation album Greatest Hits 1990–1999: A Tribute to a Work in Progress... and the live album Live at the Greek. Their sixth studio album, Lions, was released in 2001. The live album Live was released in 2002.

From 2002 to 2005, The Black Crowes went on hiatus. Since re-forming, they have released three studio albums. 2008's Warpaint, and Before the Frost...Until the Freeze in 2009.  They also released two live albums, and one compilation album. Warpaint peaked at number five on the Billboard 200 and was their first album to peak in the top ten since The Southern Harmony and Musical Companion.

Albums

Studio albums

EPs

Live albums and videos

Compilation albums

Singles

Other appearances

References

Discography
Blues discographies
Discographies of American artists
Rock music group discographies